Mönkemeyer is a surname. Notable people with the surname include:

 Nils Mönkemeyer (born 1978), German violist and teacher
 Uwe Mönkemeyer (born 1959), German Olympic runner
 Wilhelm Mönkemeyer (1862–1938), German bryologist

German-language surnames